Wynyate is a historic house in South Pasadena, California, U.S.. It was built circa 1887 for Donald M. Graham, the first mayor of Pasadena, and his wife, author Margaret Collier Graham. It was designed in the Victorian architectural style. Authors Mary Hunter Austin and Charles Fletcher Lummis were frequent guests, as was John Muir, who planted a eucalyptus tree in the garden in 1889. The house has been listed on the National Register of Historic Places since April 24, 1973.

References

Houses on the National Register of Historic Places in California
Victorian architecture in California
Houses completed in 1887
Houses in Los Angeles County, California